Since the premiere of the anime adaptation of Eiichiro Oda's One Piece manga in 1999, Toei Animation has produced 15 feature films based on the franchise traditionally released during the Japanese school spring break since 2000. Four of the films were originally shown as double features alongside other Toei film productions and thus have a running time below feature length (between 30 and 56 minutes). The films generally use original storylines, but some adapt story arcs from the manga directly. With the release of films ten, twelve, thirteen, and fourteen, tie-in story arcs of the TV series were aired concurrently.

Additionally, three of these films have had special featurette shorts, showcasing the characters engaged in various activities unrelated to the series. They were shown dancing in Jango's Dance Carnival with Clockwork Island Adventure; playing soccer in Dream Soccer King! with Chopper's Kingdom on the Island of Strange Animals; and playing baseball in Take Aim! The Pirate Baseball King with The Curse of the Sacred Sword. There are also 13 television specials that were broadcast on Fuji TV and two short films, which were shown at the 1998 Jump Super Anime Tour and 2008 Jump Super Anime Tour, respectively.

As with the franchise's anime television series, the eighth, tenth, twelfth, thirteenth, fourteenth, and fifteenth films have been licensed by Funimation/Crunchyroll and released in both subtitled and dubbed formats. Additionally, the first through seventh and ninth films have been released in the United Kingdom with English subtitles.

Theatrical films

One Piece 

One Piece is the first animated feature film of the franchise, starring Mayumi Tanaka as Monkey D. Luffy, Kazuya Nakai as Roronoa Zoro, Akemi Okamura as Nami, and Kappei Yamaguchi as Usopp. It premiered in Japan on March 4, 2000 and was released to DVD on January 21, 2001. The film was shown in a double bill with Digimon Adventure: Our War Game!. In the first week, the film attained second place in the Japanese box office, third place during their second week, and first place during the fourth and fifth weeks.

The legend of the Great Gold Pirate Woonan remains intact, years after his disappearance. Many pirates search for his mountain of gold hidden on a remote island, among them are Captain El Drago and his men. By hunting down every member of Woonan's former crew, they eventually take possession of a map to that hidden island. On their way there, they meet and decide to rob the Straw Hat Pirates, who, still lacking a cook, are close to starvation. A short fight ensues, during which Luffy, Zoro, and Tobio, a boy who ran away from home to become part of Woonan's crew, are separated from the other Straw Hats and their ship, staying afloat on the shattered remains of what at some point was a boat. Following the scent of food, they quickly arrive at a floating oden bar, run by Tobio's grandfather, Ganzo. El Drago and his crew land on Woonan's island, where they encounter Usopp, who, to evade being killed, convinces them that he is a professional treasure hunter, offers them his help, and using their map, starts leading them around. Meanwhile, somewhere else on the island, Zoro and Luffy, chained together for trying to eat-and-run, get lost and attempt to get back to the shore. With the help of Nami, Usopp gets away from the enemy crew. The Straw Hats meet up and take a closer look at the treasure map. They conclude that Woonan's treasure must be hidden on the island's only mountain and set out to climb it. On their way up, they meet Ganzo, who reveals to them that he and Woonan had grown up like brothers in the same village. Atop the mountain they find an empty house with a secret entry to a basement. El Drago and his men arrive and are beaten by Luffy and Zoro. Then the group climbs into the basement. There, Woonan's skeleton is sitting in an empty room, a message for his old friend Ganzo written on the walls. With gold from El Drago's ship, the Straw Hats set sail, resuming course for the Grand Line.

Clockwork Island Adventure 

Clockwork Island Adventure is the second animated feature film of the franchise, the first to use digital ink and paint and the first to additionally star Hiroaki Hirata as Sanji. It premiered in Japan on March 3, 2001 and was released to DVD on October 21, 2001. The film was shown in a double bill with Digimon Adventure 02: Diaboromon Strikes Back. The film was shown along with a six-minute featurette short named Jango's Dance Carnival.

While the Straw Hats enjoy a warm day at the beach, their ship with all their equipment and weapons is stolen. They can do nothing but watch, as it disappears into the distance. A week later, dressed in cloth from a rental store for wedding ceremonies and riding a one-person paddle boat they set out to go after their lost belongings. At sea, they encounter the boy Akizu and the young man Borodo. The two call themselves the Thief Brothers and claim to be after a well-known treasure, called the Diamond Clock from Clockwork Island. Actually, they are the ones who stole the Straw Hats' ship and brought it to Clockwork Island to make the Straw Hats fight the Trump Siblings. The Trump Siblings Boo Jack, Honey Queen, Skunk One, Pin Joker, and Bear King (the leader), are another pirate crew who occupied Clockwork Island for years and forced its inhabitants to build weapons. A number of ships bearing the mark of the Trump Siblings appear and a short fight ensues, during which the Thief Brothers' ship is destroyed and Nami abducted. Using mere pieces of wood to stay afloat and an improvised sail for propulsion, the group manages to reach the foot of Clockwork Island. A long, circular staircase laced with deadly traps leads up to the actual island. There, Nami makes the acquaintance of the Trump Siblings' captain, Bear King. He takes a liking to her and decides to make her his bride. Eventually the Thief Brothers and the remaining Straw Hats make it to the end of the stairway and onto the main island. A beautiful landscape appears in front of them, but the island's citizens are in no mood to cherish it. Not knowing that Akizu is their son, a pair of them tells the group of the island's past. Then the heroes storm the Trump Siblings' stronghold, built around the island's key, which holds the island together. One after another, the Straw Hats get picked off and captured, until only Luffy remains. Once he reaches the stronghold's top and frees his crew, the movie climaxes in an all-out battle, during which the Trump Siblings are defeated and the island's key is destroyed. Clockwork Island crashes down into the ocean, but Akizu reunites with his family and the Straw Hats reclaim their ship.

Chopper's Kingdom on the Island of Strange Animals 

Chopper's Kingdom on the Island of Strange Animals is the third animated feature film of the franchise and the first to additionally star Ikue Ohtani as Tony Tony Chopper. It premiered in Japan on March 2, 2002 and was released to DVD on October 21, 2002. The film was shown in a double bill with Digimon Tamers: Runaway Locomon. From the first week, the film made a six-week run in the Top 10 of the Japanese box office, placing third in the first two weeks, fifth and fourth in the third and fourth weeks, respectively, and sixth in the fifth and sixth weeks. The film was shown along with a six-minute featurette short named Dream Soccer King!.

With Chopper as their newest member, the Straw Hats arrive at the Island of Strange Animals. Before they can land, a geyser-like fountain sends their ship flying. Chopper falls off and lands in the middle of a gathering of animals. They are performing a ritual, which according to their legend, is supposed to cause a king to fall from the heavens. Believing that legend fulfilled, they proclaim Chopper their new king. The other Straw Hats, searching for their lost crewmate, make the acquaintance of the self-proclaimed genius and expert treasure hunter Count Butler, with his henchmen General Hot Dog and President Snake. Butler is in search of the horns of a particular animal living on the island, which when eaten bestows great power upon the eater. For that purpose, he uses a hoard of bovinae-like animals called horn eaters, which he controls by playing music on a special violin, to round up horn bearing animals. The Straw Hats, unknowingly, lead Butler to Chopper and the group of animals, whose king he has become. Butler gives the gathered animals an ultimatum, to hand over their king, whose horns he believes to be what he is looking for, or to be crushed by his horn eaters. But Chopper does not need to be turned over. He steps forward himself and lures the horn eaters away from the island's animals. A fight ensues and it does not take long until the remaining Straw Hats join in to take their fill. Zoro takes on Hot Dog and Sanji fights with Snake, while Usopp and Nami take care of the horn eaters. Butler fights with Chopper and is about to finish him off, when Momambi, a young boy and the only human inhabitant of the island, shows up with the former king's horns to lure Butler away from Chopper. The plan backfires, as Butler gets hold of the horns, quickly stuffs them down, and transforms into a large, horned, gorilla-like animal. With that he appears to be winning, until the island's animals and Luffy enter the fight. Luffy defeats Butler and breaks his horns, thus canceling his transformation, and sends him flying. Mobambi fears to be exiled from the island for losing the former king's horns but instead is elected the animal king.

Dead End Adventure 

Dead End Adventure is the fourth animated feature film of the franchise and the first to additionally star Yuriko Yamaguchi as Nico Robin. It premiered in Japan on March 1, 2003 and was released to DVD on July 21, 2003. The film made a seven-week run in the Top 10 of the Japanese box office, placing second in its first week of showing, then fifth for two weeks, sixth for another two weeks, seventh in its sixth week, and tenth in its seventh week of showing.

In a port town pub, the once again flat broke Straw Hats witness a suspicious exchange between a customer and the proprietor. Nami immediately senses money and plans to convince the host to give her whatever information he had given him. The other Straw Hats join in and soon he is persuaded. He shows them to a backdoor, behind which they find a long and winding tunnel. That tunnel leads to a large underground chamber, where a number of pirate crews have a gathering. The island they are on turns out to be the starting point of an irregularly occurring, anything-goes sailing competition. For a moment, the Straw Hats decide whether it is wise to join the race, considering that two giants and a crew of fish-men, who were once the rivals of Arlong's gang, were participating as well. But once they learn the magnitude of the prize money, not entering is out of the question. From the bookmaker they receive an eternal pose, to lead them to the goal of the race. Free food is available at the bottom of the chamber and Luffy makes extensive use of it. His eating habit of stealing other people's food quickly angers the bounty hunter Shuraiya Bascùd, as well as a group of men from General Gasparde's crew. Gasparde is a deserted marine, with a bounty more than three times as high as Luffy's and said to be the race's favorite. A fight arises, and after Luffy and Shuraiya beat up his men, they find themselves standing before the general himself. He is impressed with their skill and offers both of them to work under him. Of course they refuse, but Luffy finds some insulting words and is caught off guard by Gasparde's right-hand man, Needles. Luffy's courage impresses Gasparde even more. He renews his offer, orders Needles to let go of the rookie pirate, and leaves the room. The next morning, a strong ocean current starts the race, by pushing the ships upstream over the island. As soon as they are over the top, the various crews start shooting broadsides, board each other's ships, and ram their competitors out of the water. But once the island is left behind, the field quickly clears up, leaving the Straw Hats time to eat. While inspecting the ship, Zoro discovers a boy named Anaguma, who had stowed away in order to earn money by killing some pirate to buy medicine for his adoptive grandfather, who works as an engineer on Gasparde's partially steam-powered ship. The race continues. After fighting yet another rival crew and an encounter with a group of large sea kings, they arrive at the island the eternal pose points to. The eternal poses were all mislabeled and led the fleet of unsuspecting pirates into reach of the cannons of the navy stronghold Navarone. Luffy has no doubt as to whose fault it is. They turn around and, using Chopper's fine nose, attempt to catch up with Gasparde's ship. Shuraiya, who had followed Gasparde's invitation to come along on his ship, turns against him to take revenge for Gasparde's killing his parents and sister. He fights Needles and throws him overboard but stands no chance against Gasparde's Syrup-Syrup Logia-type powers, which allow him to turn parts or all of his body into liquid or solid candy. The general is about to kill the bounty hunter when the Straw Hats arrive and catch his attention. Luffy confronts him and the two engage in a fierce but one-sided battle. Any attack Luffy throws at his opponent causes his limbs to get stuck in Gasparde's body. Only after Sanji gives two sacks of flour to Luffy can he overcome the villain's ability. Anaguma turns out to be a girl and Shuraiya's thought-dead sister, Adele Bascùd. With all their competitors taken out, the Straw Hats are about to finish the race, when a fleet of navy ships appears and forces them to abandon their prize money.

The Cursed Holy Sword 

The Cursed Holy Sword is the fifth animated feature film of the franchise. It premiered in Japan on March 6, 2004 and was released to DVD on July 21, 2004. The film made a five-week run in the Top 10 of the Japanese box office. In its first week of showing, it made third place, fourth place in its second week, followed by three weeks in fifth place. The film was shown along with a five-minute featurette short named Take Aim! The Pirate Baseball King.

Zoro goes missing, as the Straw Hats restock. On their search for him, Sanji, Nami, Chopper, and Robin follows Maya, a girl of the island, to a village. There, Zoro appears, accompanied by a group of marines. Zoro wields his sword against Sanji and takes three jewel orbs from Maya. Luffy stumbles upon a training center of the local Marine division. There, he encounters Saga, the leader of the center and owner of the Seven Star Sword, who made Zoro take the orbs to revive that sword's slumbering power. Luffy fights him but falls from a cliff. The Seven Stars Sword was that which had ruined the country of Asuka with its cursed power a long time ago and had therefore been sealed. But with a night of a red full moon that occurs only once every hundred years, the jewel orbs in his possession, and Zoro on his side, only the remaining Straw Hats stand in the way of Saga reviving the sword's true power.

Baron Omatsuri and the Secret Island 

Baron Omatsuri and the Secret Island is the sixth animated feature film of the franchise. It premiered in Japan on March 5, 2005 and was released to DVD on July 21, 2005. The film had a six-week run in the Top 10 of the Japanese box office. It made third place in its first week, fourth place in its second week, followed by two weeks at sixth place, fifth place in its fifth week, and seventh place in the sixth week.

The Straw Hats receive an invitation to an island resort on the Grand Line run by Baron Omatsuri, and the crew travels to the island intent on relaxing and having fun. The Baron welcomes them to the resort and encourages them to enjoy themselves, but only after they complete 'The Trials Of Hell'. The crew is hesitant, but Luffy accepts the challenge. The Straw Hats win the first trial, but the outraged Baron demands they compete in another challenge. Luffy, Chopper, and Robin wait at the resort while the rest of the crew participates in the second trial. Robin questions Muchigoro, one of Baron's crewmates, about a flower on the island. Muchigoro mentions something about the "Lily Carnation" being at the island's summit before running off. Luffy and Chopper wander off, both meeting other pirates who had previously arrived and participated in the trials. Luffy receives an ominous warning about Baron splitting up his crew. Chopper learns about Baron's past, but right before he figures out the mystery, he is stricken with an arrow shot by Baron. The Straw Hats win again, but rifts begin to grow between the crew members. The crew notices Chopper is missing, but Baron interrupts them with a dinner party. The Baron notices Robin leaving, and she reveals to him that she was looking for the Lily Carnation. Baron reveals the flower's secret to Robin while Robin looks shocked. The Straw Hats realize Chopper, Usopp, and Robin are gone. Arguments over who's to blame for their disappearances ensue before Baron announces the final trial. Tension between the crew results in the crew splitting up. The island known as Omatsuri Island was really a pirate island, only advertised as a resort by the Baron to lure pirates to the island to bring the same suffering and hatred he felt unto everyone else.  Baron feeds the crew to the Lily Carnation, a flower of reincarnation, which gives life to Baron's crew. Luffy manages to save them from the Lily Carnation and defeat Baron with help from other pirates on the island. Baron cries for his friends that were lost and how he is alone. He had been fooling himself for years with the false constructs of his crew created by the Lily Carnation. Each of his dead crewmates speak with him, telling him that they were happy to be remembered, but not with his corrupted charade. They apologize for leaving him alone for so long but believe it would be for the best if he forgets the night they died and finds new friends. Luffy lays exhausted on the ground while the crew all appear unharmed with no memory of the incident. The Straw Hats gather around Luffy, wondering how he can sleep in such a place, and Luffy laughs.

The animation in this film is very different from the regular series, using the style often seen in Mamoru Hosoda's films. Some of the later episodes use styles similar to those seen in this film. The story also differs from the usually carefree and high strung style of writing that One Piece follows. The film follows a darker style of writing which received with mixed reviews.

Giant Mecha Soldier of Karakuri Castle 

Giant Mecha Soldier of Karakuri Castle is the seventh animated feature film of the franchise. It premiered in Japan on March 4, 2006 and was released to DVD on July 21, 2006. The film had a six-week run in the Top 10 of the Japanese box office. It made fourth place in its first week, sixth place in its second week, and seventh place in its third week. In its fourth week of showing, the film placed sixth again, followed by fifth place in week five, and tenth place in its sixth week of showing.

The Straw Hats visit an island, known as Mecha Island, where a fisherman sings an old folk song about a Golden Crown. Searching for that mysterious treasure, they find a hidden entrance into the island. The island's leader, Ratchet, impressed with the find and in search of the Golden Crown himself, invites the crew to join him in his search, and the crew along with Ratchet and his henchmen enter the cave. As it turns out, the island's true form is that of a giant turtle. Ratchet, who had known this all along, uses his mechanical castle to take control of the turtle wishing to use it to take over the world. Now the Straw Hats have to stop not only Ratchet, but also the helpless turtle, from crashing into a nearby island.

The Desert Princess and the Pirates: Adventures in Alabasta 

The Desert Princess and the Pirates: Adventures in Alabasta is the eighth animated feature film of the franchise and the only One Piece film to additionally star Misa Watanabe as Nefeltari Vivi. It premiered in Japan on March 3, 2007 and was released to DVD on July 21, 2007. The film was licensed by Funimation and given a limited theatrical release in the United States on February 7, 2008. Funimation also released the film to DVD on February 19, 2008 and to Blu-ray on January 27, 2009. The film placed four times in the Top 10 of the Japanese weekend box office. It placed second in its first week, fourth in its second week, and ninth in its third and fourth weeks of showing.

The Straw Hats travel to Alabasta, the desert island and home of Nefertari Vivi. They find the country in the middle of a revolution. Sir Crocodile, the country's hero, secretly used his criminal organization, Baroque Works, to undermine the citizens' trust in Cobra, Vivi's father and head of the Kingdom of Sand, in order to seize the throne and the country's hidden secret for himself. The crew now has to cross the desert, stop the revolution, save thousands of lives from Baroque Works' hidden bombers, and most of all, defeat Crocodile, one of the mighty Seven Warlords of the Sea.

Episode of Chopper Plus: Bloom in the Winter, Miracle Sakura 

Episode of Chopper Plus: Bloom in the Winter, Miracle Sakura is the ninth animated feature film of the franchise and the first to additionally star Kazuki Yao as Franky. It premiered in Japan on March 1, 2008 and was released to DVD on July 21, 2008. The film had a five-week run in the Top 10 of the Japanese box office. It placed third in its first week of showing, seventh in its second, eighth in its third week, tenth in its fourth week, and ninth in its fifth week.

It is the second film to focus on Chopper, as it is a retelling of the Drum Island storyline from the manga. It features Franky, Nico Robin, and the Thousand Sunny, who weren't present in the original version.

One Piece Film: Strong World 

One Piece Film: Strong World is the tenth animated feature film of the franchise, and the first to additionally star Chō as Brook. It was written by manga creator Eiichiro Oda himself. It was directed by Munehisa Sakai. News of the film first appeared during a showing of the Episode of Chopper Plus, during which a teaser for the tenth film was revealed. The film was originally meant for a spring release in 2009, but complications with the script pushed the release date back. Eventually, the film premiered on December 12, 2009. On July 28, 2012, Funimation announced that they had acquired the license to One Piece Film: Strong World and have since released the film on November 19, 2013.

As stated, the film is an original story written by Eiichiro Oda himself in honor of One Piece's Tenth Anniversary. In previous films, Oda only supplied character designs and approved story ideas. For One Piece Film: Strong World, Toei personally asked if he would write the script. The film is set between the Thriller Bark Arc and the Sabaody Archipelago Arc, as Brook is shown alongside the other Straw Hat Pirates (making this his first film appearance), and Sengoku and Garp are still in their positions in the Marines.

Straw Hat Chase 

Straw Hat Chase is the eleventh animated feature film of the franchise and the first to also use computer animation. It was directed by Hiroyuki Satō and was released in Japan on March 19, 2011, and was released to DVD and Blu-ray on July 20, 2011. It was double billed with the Toriko film Toriko 3D: Kaimaku! Gourmet Adventure! The film features Tomomitsu Yamaguchi as Schneider and Bazz, and the music was written and performed by the Tokyo Ska Paradise Orchestra. It was released as Jump Heroes Movies and Grossed $9,796,866 worldwide.

Luffy desperately tries to find his missing straw hat, and after extensive searching Usopp discovers that an eagle has it. Luffy and the entire Crew proceed to chase the eagle. While searching for Luffy's hat, Chopper discovers an old man lying half dead on a ship. While Luffy continues chasing the eagle and eventually crashes it into a marine base, the old man named Schneider wakes up. Chopper noticed that he had been mumbling the name Bazz in his sleep, and asks him who it is. Schneider tells Chopper that Bazz was his friend and that he was a dog that ate the "tori tori no mi: model eagle". He tells Chopper that he told Bazz to steal Monkey D. Luffy's hat and then he could come back. He thought that telling Bazz this would force him to abandon Schneider, because he didn't want Bazz to see him die. When Chopper informs him that not only did Bazz successfully steal Luffy's hat, but that he was on the Straw Hat Pirates' ship. Schneider immediately jumps out of bed and runs to save Bazz who at that moment is trapped in a cage with Luffy, made of kairouseki. After Luffy's crew frees him and Bazz, Schneider apologizes to Bazz and tells him to give up on the hat. Luffy meanwhile is fighting his way through a whole marine base along with three giants. Finally he makes it to the marine captain holding his hat, only to have him throw it out to sea. Luffy immediately jumps out after it, and almost has it when he starts to fall. Bazz then comes to his rescue and Luffy finally retrieves his hat. Afterwards Schneider and Bazz decide to go back out to sea and Schneider tells Luffy that the hat suits him.

One Piece Film: Z 

The 12th One Piece film was released on December 15, 2012. As with Strong World, it is overseen by Eiichiro Oda.  As well, it is the first One Piece film to take place in the New World, after the two-year time-skip. Zephyr (referred to as Z), an ex-admiral of the marines and leader of the Neo Navy, steals the Marines stash of "Dyna Stones", powerful explosives, that, when exposed to oxygen, explode with enough force to destroy islands. Using these stones, he plans on destroying the 3 End Points (3 volcanoes in the New World that connect to huge lava sources) and flood the New World with lava. When he runs into the Straw Hats and one of his subordinates revert Nami, Chopper, Robin, and Brook younger in age. It's up to Luffy, his crew, and other unexpected allies to find and stop Z from finishing his plan while having to fight not only the Neo Navy, but the Marines as well.

The film also portrays the cast wearing Armani Exchange suits in one part of the film, possibly as a promotional campaign. This was done in collaboration with the creator of the series, Eiichiro Oda, who selected the outfits designed by Armani Exchange. The Shibuya branch of Armani Exchange sells some of the suits in the film.

One Piece Film: Gold 

The 13th One Piece film was released on July 23, 2016. The film followed the July 16, 2016 TV special titled One Piece: Heart of Gold. The first 2016 issue of Shueisha's Weekly Shonen Jump magazine also revealed that Eiichiro Oda would be part of the anime film as executive producer. The report also states that anime director Hiroaki Miyamoto, who helmed "One Piece" episodes 352-679 and was assistant director for "One Piece: Baron Omatsuri and the Secret Island," will be part of the "One Piece Film: Gold" as director. This anime film was penned by Tsutomu Kuroiwa, the scriptwriter of the live-action "Black Butler" film, the live-action "Liar Game: The Final Stage" film, and the live-action "The Perfect Insider" TV series.

One Piece: Stampede 

The 14th One Piece film was released on August 9, 2019. It was directed by Takashi Otsuka and was first announced following the broadcast of Episode of Skypiea. The film commemorates the anime's 20th anniversary.

One Piece Film: Red 

The 15th One Piece film was released on August 6, 2022. It was first announced in the November 21, 2021 issue of Weekly Shōnen Jump in commemoration of the anime Episode 1000's release.

Reception

Box office performance

See also
 List of One Piece media
 List of One Piece television specials

Notes

References

Film series introduced in 2000
Anime film series
films
Films
Lists of anime films
Toei Animation films
Lists of films by franchise
Lists of films based on manga